Catapulte was a   built for the French Navy in the first decade of the 20th century. Completed in 1903, the ship was assigned to the Northern Squadron.

Design and description
The Arquebuse class was designed as a faster version of the preceding . The two vertical triple-expansion steam engines each drove one propeller shaft using steam provided by two du Temple Guyot or Normand boilers. Their crew consisted of four officers and fifty-eight enlisted men.

The main armament of the Arquebuse-class ships consisted of a single  gun forward of the bridge and six  Hotchkiss guns in single mounts, three on each broadside. They were fitted with two single rotating mounts for  torpedo tubes on the centerline, one between the funnels and the other on the stern.

On 11 May 1918, Caiatpulte assisted several other ships in rescuing the survivors of the French troopship , which was carrying 2,025 troops when she was torpedoed and sunk in the Mediterranean Sea with the loss of 605 lives by the Imperial German Navy submarine SM UC-54 26 nautical miles east of Cape Bon, French Tunisia.

On 18 May 1918, Catapulte collided with the British steamer . Both ships sank in the Mediterranean Sea off Bône, French Algeria.

References

Bibliography

 

Arquebuse-class destroyers
Ships built in France
1903 ships
Maritime incidents in 1918
Ships sunk in collisions
World War I shipwrecks in the Mediterranean Sea